Bastien Auzeil (born 22 October 1989 in Pont-de-Beauvoisin) is a French athlete competing in the decathlon. He won the silver medal at the 2015 Summer Universiade in addition to a bronze at the 2013 Jeux de la Francophonie.

He is a son of Nadine Auzeil, a former Olympic javelin thrower.

Competition record

Personal bests
Outdoor
100 metres – 11.02 (-0.1 m/s) (Götzis 2015)
200 metres – 23.84 (-5.3 m/s) (Grenoble 2012)
400 metres – 48.66 (Beijing 2015)
1500 metres – 4:37.92 (Beijing 2015)
110 metres hurdles – 14.29 (+0.3 m/s) (Roanne 2015)
High jump – 2.04 (Aubagne 2012)
Pole vault – 5.10 (Cannes-la-Bocca 2012)
Long jump – 7.34 (+1.3 m/s) (Nice 2013)
Triple jump – 12.79 (0.0 m/s) (La Roche-sur-Yon 2008)
Shot put – 15.90 (Götzis 2015)
Discus throw – 47.02 (Angers 2016)
Hammer throw – 48.91 (Aix-les-Bains 2012)
Javelin throw – 64.41 (Götzis 2015)
Decathlon – 8191 (Angers 2016)

Indoor
60 metres – 7.08 (Prague 2015)
1000 metres – 2:46.93 (Prague 2015)
60 metres hurdles – 8.10 (Prague 2015)
High jump – 2.01 (Prague 2015)
Pole vault – 5.20 (Prague 2015)
Long jump – 7.39 (Bordeaux 2014)
Shot put – 15.81 (Bordeaux 2014)
Heptathlon – 6011 (Prague 2015)

References

External links 
 
 

1989 births
Living people
French decathletes
World Athletics Championships athletes for France
Athletes (track and field) at the 2016 Summer Olympics
Olympic athletes of France
Universiade medalists in athletics (track and field)
Universiade silver medalists for France
Medalists at the 2015 Summer Universiade
Sportspeople from Isère